The women's triple jump event at the 1995 Pan American Games was held at the Estadio Atletico "Justo Roman" on 17 March. It was the first time that this event was contested at the Pan American Games.

Results

References

Athletics at the 1995 Pan American Games
1995
Pan